The International Racquetball Federation's 18th Racquetball World Championships were held in Cali, Colombia from July 15 to 23, 2016. This was the first time Colombia has hosted Worlds, and the first time Worlds have been in South America since 1998, when Cochabamba, Bolivia hosted the event.

American Rocky Carson and Mexican Paola Longoria are the incumbent champions in men's and women's singles, respectively.

Longoria was also the incumbent champion in women's doubles with Samantha Salas and they also successfully defended their title. Colombians Sebastian Franco and Alejandro Herrera will be trying to defend the men's doubles title that they won in Canada two years ago.

Tournament format
The 2016 World Championships used a two-stage format to determine the World Champions. Initially, players competed in separate groups over three days. The results were used to seed players for an elimination round. Thus, there was no team competition. Team standings were based on points earned from the singles and doubles competitions.

Events

Men's singles

Women's singles

Men's doubles

Women's doubles

Medal table

Team results

References

External links
IRF website

 
2016 in Colombian sport
2016 in racquetball
Racquetball World Championships
Sport in Cali
International sports competitions hosted by Colombia
July 2016 sports events in South America